Farid Beziouen (born 17 October 1986) is a French professional footballer who plays for FC 93 B-B-G.

Career
In June 2019, Beziouen joined US Lusitanos Saint-Maur.

References

External links
 Farid Beziouen profile at Foot-National.com
 
 
 

1986 births
Living people
Sportspeople from Saint-Denis, Seine-Saint-Denis
French sportspeople of Algerian descent
French footballers
Footballers from Seine-Saint-Denis
Association football midfielders
Ligue 2 players
Championnat National players
Championnat National 2 players
Championnat National 3 players
Olympique Noisy-le-Sec players
US Créteil-Lusitanos players
Red Star F.C. players
CS Sedan Ardennes players
JS Kabylie players
US Avranches players
FC Fleury 91 players
US Lusitanos Saint-Maur players
Football Club 93 Bobigny-Bagnolet-Gagny players